Margaret of England (20 July 1346 – October/December 1361) was a royal princess born in Windsor, the daughter of King Edward III of England and his consort, Philippa of Hainault. Margaret would be the last princess born to a reigning English monarch for over a century, until the birth of Elizabeth of York in 1466. She was also known as Margaret of Windsor.

Marriage
Margaret was the daughter of King Edward III of England and his consort, Philippa of Hainault. She was also known as Margaret of Windsor. Margaret's first marriage prospect was Albert III of Austria but this changed due to politics at the time. A few years later she was affianced to John of Blois, son of Charles of Blois and rival of John V of Brittany to the Breton throne; however, this engagement was abandoned because her sister Mary was already betrothed to John IV of Brittany.

Margaret was raised with John Hastings, 2nd Earl of Pembroke, son of Laurence Hastings, 1st Earl of Pembroke and his wife Agnes, the daughter of Roger Mortimer (the favourite of Isabella of France). As children they had a close companionship. On 13 May 1359, she became the wife of John Hastings in the same week as her brother John of Gaunt, 1st Duke of Lancaster married Blanche of Lancaster, in Reading.

Early death
Two years later, Margaret died, and was buried in Abingdon Abbey. The exact date and cause of her death is unknown; she was last mentioned as living on 1 October 1361.

References

1346 births
1361 deaths
14th-century English people
14th-century English women
English princesses
Pembroke
House of Plantagenet
People from Windsor, Berkshire
Margaret, Countess of Pembroke
Children of Edward III of England
Daughters of kings
Burials in Oxfordshire